Sagisma is a fossil genus of aquatic plants.  It includes two species distributed in Oligocene and Miocene deposits of western Siberia.

References

Alismataceae
Alismataceae genera
Oligocene plants
Miocene plants
Prehistoric angiosperm genera